This page includes variants Nasmith, Nasmyth, and Naysmith.

General
 Naismith's Rule, used in hiking
 Nasmyth telescope
 Primary enamel cuticle, also known as Nasmyth's membrane

Places
 Naismith, Montana
 Nasmyth (crater) on the Moon

Companies
 McClure Naismith, Scottish commercial solicitors
 Nasmyth, Gaskell and Company (1836–1850), production of heavy machine tools and locomotives, later James Nasmyth and Company (1850–1857), Patricroft Ironworks (1857–1867), Nasmyth, Wilson and Company (1867–1940)

People
Naismith (Nasmith, Nasmyth, Naysmith) is an occupational surname for a cutler, and may refer to:

Naismith
 Alby Naismith (born 1917), Australian rules footballer
 Charlie Naismith (1881–unknown), Australian rules footballer
 James Naismith (1861–1939), Canadian sports coach and innovator, inventor of basketball
 James Naismith (chemist) (born 1968), chemical biologist
 Jason Naismith (born 1994), Scottish footballer
 Jon Naismith (born 1965), British television producer
 Joseph Nasmith (1850-1904), British consulting engineer and author
 Kal Naismith (born 1992), Scottish footballer
 Laurence Naismith (1908–1992), English actor
 Steven Naismith (born 1986), Scottish footballer
 Wally Naismith (1881–1954), Australian rules footballer
 William W. Naismith (1856–1935), Scottish mountaineer

Nasmith
 David Nasmith (1799–1839), founder of the City Mission Movement
 David Dunbar-Nasmith (1921–1997), Royal Navy admiral
 James Nasmith (1740–1808), English clergyman, academic and antiquary
 James Dunbar-Nasmith (born 1927), British conservation architect
 Martin Nasmith, later Martin Dunbar-Nasmith (1883–1965), Royal Navy admiral, recipient of the Victoria Cross
 Ted Nasmith (born 1950s), Canadian artist, illustrator and architectural renderer

Nasmyth 
Sir James Nasmyth, 1st Baronet (died 1720), Scottish lawyer
Sir James Nasmyth, 2nd Baronet   (c. 1704-1779), Scottish botanist and politician, son of 1st Baronet
Alexander Nasmyth (1758–1840), Scottish portrait and landscape painter, father of Anne, Barbara, Charlotte, James, Jane and Patrick
Jane Nasmyth (1787–1867), Scottish landscape painter, daughter of Alexander
Barbara Nasmyth (1790-1870), Scottish painter, daughter of Alexander
Anne Nasmyth (1798–1874), Scottish painter, daughter of Alexander
Charlotte Nasmyth (1804-1884), Scottish painter, daughter of Alexander
James Nasmyth (1808–1890),  Scottish engineer, inventor of the steam hammer and the Nasmyth telescope, son of Alexander
Patrick Nasmyth (1787–1831), Scottish landscape painter, son of Alexander
Thomas Goodall Nasmyth (1855-1937), Scottish physician, medical author and historian
Beatrice Nasmyth (1885-1977), Canadian suffragette and war correspondent
Kim Nasmyth (born 1952), British biochemistry professor

Naysmith
Doug Naysmith (born 1941), British politician
John Murray  Naysmith, garden designer, including York Museum Gardens
Gary Naysmith (born 1978), Scottish footballer

See also
 Naismith College Player of the Year, for basketball
 Naismith Prep Player of the Year Award, for basketball
 Nesmith (disambiguation)

English-language surnames
Scottish surnames
Occupational surnames
English-language occupational surnames